The International Conference on Automated Software Engineering (ASE) is a large annual software engineering conference. The first conference in the series was held in 1986. Between 1986 and 1990 the conference was known as Knowledge-Based Software Assistant (KBSA), between 1991 and 1996 the conference was known as Knowledge-Based Software Engineering (KBSE).

List of Conferences
Past and future ASE conferences include:

References

External links
 ASE Conference

Software engineering conferences